Trondhjems Elektricitetsværk og Sporvei was a municipally owned power company and tram operator in Trondheim, Norway between 1901 and 1936 when the company was split in Trondheim Energiverk (TEV) and Trondheim Sporvei. The company was founded on November 4, 1901, to build a hydro electric power plant at Øvre Leirfoss and the Trondheim Tramway that replaced the old horse omnibus service from 1893.

Through the company the tramway in Trondheim was expanded to Elgeseter with Elgeseterlinjen in 1913 and to Trondheim Central Station. The company was organised as a municipal agency. Today both the successors of the company are owned by the Government of Norway with TEV being a subsidiary of Statkraft while Trondheim Sporvei now is part of Team Trafikk, a subsidiary of Nettbuss.

References
TEV History

Trondheim Tramway operators
Companies based in Trondheim
Defunct electric power companies of Norway
Companies formerly owned by municipalities of Norway
Defunct railway companies of Norway
Defunct companies of Norway
Railway companies established in 1901
Railway companies disestablished in 1936
1936 disestablishments in Norway
Norwegian companies established in 1901